Moisés Rodríguez Laínez (born 2 April 1997), commonly known as just Moi, is a Spanish footballer who plays for CF Villanovense as a centre-back.

Club career
Born in Los Palacios y Villafranca, Seville, Andalusia, Moi joined Cádiz CF midway through the 2015–16 season, after already having made his senior debut with La Liara Balompié in the regional leagues. In 2016, after finishing his formation, he was promoted to the reserves also in the lower leagues.

Moi subsequently became a regular starter for the Amarillos, helping the B's with two promotions in 2017 and 2019. On 5 August 2019, he renewed his contract with the club until 2021.

Moi made his first team debut on 20 July 2020, coming on as a first-half substitute for the injured Marc Baró in a 0–1 home loss against Albacete Balompié in the Segunda División.

References

External links

1997 births
Living people
People from Los Palacios y Villafranca
Sportspeople from the Province of Seville
Spanish footballers
Footballers from Andalusia
Association football defenders
Segunda División players
Segunda División B players
Tercera División players
Divisiones Regionales de Fútbol players
Cádiz CF B players
Cádiz CF players
CD Utrera players
CF Villanovense players